was a renowned Japanese photographer. He was taught by Yokoyama Matsusaburō.

References

Japanese photographers
1832 births
1915 deaths